Polar is the second album by The High Water Marks. It was released in 2007 on Happy Happy Birthday To Me Records.

Track listing
All tracks were written by Hilarie Sidney and Per Ole Bratset except for "Poison Remedy" and "Etter Sirkel", both written by Jim Lindsay.
 "Polar" – 5:09
 "The Leaves" – 4:08
 "Early Fall" – 3:45
 "Song For Emigrants" – 4:13
 "Simple" – 2:44
 "Galaxy Galaxy Galaxy" – 3:12
 "Finding Clovers" – 2:23
 "Dutch Tape" – 4:20
 "Roadside Revival" – 3:43
 "Poison Remedy" – 1:50
 "For Sirkel" – 0:43
 "Sirkel" – 3:13
 "Etter Sirkel" – 1:27

Personnel

The High Water Marks
Jim Lindsay - drums, percussion, vocals, keyboards, piano
Hilarie Sidney - guitar, vocals, keyboards, drums, xylophone
Per Ole Bratset - guitars, vocals
Mike Snowden - bass guitar

Production
Polar was recorded and mixed by Hilarie Sidney, produced by The High Water Marks, and mastered by Jason Nesmith. Artwork for the album is by Per Ole Bratset. Album layout by Eric Hernandez.

References

2007 albums
The High Water Marks albums